Charaxes fulgurata, the lightning charaxes, is a butterfly in the family Nymphalidae. It is found in northern Angola, the Democratic Republic of the Congo (Lualaba, Lomami), north-western Zimbabwe and Zambia.

Description
Forewing above with large marginal spots and 3—7 strongly curved submarginal spots, the extremities of which reach the marginal spots; in addition with 2 or 3 discal spots and a spot in the cell. Hindwing with fine postdiscal lunules and thick marginal streaks, in cellules 4—6 
dotted with red. Under surface light reddish brown. Angola
There are at least two distinctive female forms.

Biology
The habitat consists of Brachystegia woodland and savanna woodland.

Adults have been observed feeding on elephant dung.

The larvae feed on Erythrophleum africanum and Amblygonocarpus andongensis.

Taxonomy
Charaxes fulgurata is a member of the large species group Charaxes etheocles.

References

Victor Gurney Logan Van Someren, 1966 Revisional notes on African Charaxes (Lepidoptera: Nymphalidae). Part III. Bulletin of the British Museum (Natural History) (Entomology) 45-101.

External links
Charaxes fulgurata images at Consortium for the Barcode of Life
Images of C. fulgurata Royal Museum for Central Africa (Albertine Rift Project)

Butterflies described in 1899
fulgurata
Butterflies of Africa
Taxa named by Per Olof Christopher Aurivillius